The 2000 Suwon Samsung Bluewings season was Suwon Samsung Bluewings's fifth season in the K-League in Republic of Korea. Suwon Samsung Bluewings is competing in K-League, League Cup, Korean FA Cup, Super Cup and Asian Club Championship.

Squad

Backroom Staff

Coaching Staff

Honours

Club
Korean Super Cup Winners
K-League Cup Winners

Individual
K-League Cup Top Assistor:  Denis (4 assists)
K-League Best XI:  Denis

References

External links
 Suwon Bluewings Official website

Suwon Samsung Bluewings seasons
Suwon Samsung Bluewings